The 2019 TCR Italy Touring Car Championship will be the fifth season of the ITCC to run under TCR regulations and the 33rd season since the national touring car series was revived in 1987 as the Campionato Italiano Turismo. The series will begin at the Autodromo Nazionale Monza in April and conclude at the same track in October.

Teams and drivers

Calendar and results 
The 2019 calendar was announced on 4 December 2018, with all rounds held in Italy.

Drivers' Championship

References

External links 

 

2019 in Italian motorsport
Italy Touring Car Championship